In sociology, as defined by Murray Webster JR. and James Driskell, status generalization is: "the process by which statuses of actors external to a particular interaction are imported and allowed to determine important features of that interaction."As an example, Webster and Driskell cite the tendency of white male executives to become group leaders even if their executive skills are not relevant to the group's task.

Research
Timothy Brezina and Kenisha Winder (2003) researched white people's racial stereotyping of blacks and the association between black people and lower socioeconomic statuses. They found that negative racial stereotyping is fueled by the continuing association between race and economic disadvantage.  The mindset is that “if blacks continue to fall behind economically, then they must not be trying hard enough”. 

According to Brezina and Winder, if white people are aware of the relatively disadvantaged positions of black people, the white people are more likely to  negative stereotype the black people.  If the black people are in a group, the white people are more likely to form a negative status generalization about them.

Paul Thomas Monroe focuses on the situation in which a low-status person gains legitimate authority or power in higher-status positions. This theory was tested using an experiment designed to have two-by-two groups working on cooperative tasks. 

 One person in the group was a confederate trying to display dominant characteristics
 The reaction of the second group member to the dominant behaviors served as the dependent variable in the study. These results show that performance evaluation had an effect on influence and status consistency.

Context
The concept of status generalization can be applied to groups that are assembled to perform a task. A group member's external status (race, age, gender, or occupation), as opposed to his or her skill, may determine their roles within the group.

Julian Oldmeadow, Michael Platow, and Margaret Foddy state: “the underlying psychological process that gives rise to (status generalization) in naturally occurring task-groups is psychological group formation, understood as self-categorization and social identification with other task-group members.” The researchers state that people naturally identify with others in a group by their physical status characteristics.  These characteristics include a person's socioeconomic status, their race, and/or their gender. After identifying these characteristics, people will establish a pecking order within the group.  This pecking order will predict each person's influence within the group (i.e. speaking order, command of topic).

When people enter a task group, they look at the physical status characteristics (skin color, age, social economic status) of each group member.  The group will probably give more power and prestige to members with the so-called  "best" characteristics. It does not matter if these characteristics are irrelevant to the task;  the group will still consider them in assigning roles to its members. 

 If a person is part of a minority, the group will often pay little attention to them, even if he or she has the right skills to perform the task.  
 If a person is a "high status" individual, the group will pay more attention to them, even if he or she doesn't have the right skills.

References

Sociological theories